Big Brother Naija Season 3, also known as Big Brother Naija: Double Wahala is the third season of the Nigerian version of the reality show Big Brother. Produced by South Africa's Red Pepper Pictures and it was launched on 28 January 2018 on DStv channel 198 which also served as a live feed form the house. Ex-housemate Ebuka Obi-Uchendu from season one as the host. This season ended on 22 April 2018, having run for 12 weeks (85 days).

Miracle Ikechukwu Igbokwe was the winner of this season.

Housemates 
During the launch night, twenty housemates entered the house.

Pairs

Nominations table
Housemates nominate in Pairs for the first six weeks. From Week 7 onwards, Housemates played and nominated individually.

Notes

 : On Launch night, Biggie set a fake eviction after all housemates entered the house. The housemates who couldn't find beds that corresponded with the numbers they received on stage must leave the house immediately. Ahneeka, Alex, Dee-One, Leo, Tobi and Vandora were fake evicted to the Arena Games Room.
 : There were no nominations in the first week. 
 : Housemates' nominations were fake, and no eviction this week. 
 : K.Brule & Khloe were ejected from the house for receiving three strikes. 
 : There were no nominations and eviction this week. 
 : On Day 26, housemates nominated pairs of their choice. Teddy A  and Nina received the most votes therefore immune from the next round of nominations.
 : On Day 43, housemates nominated individually. The Head of House was not allowed to save and replace nominated housemates.
: On Day 49, the host, Ebuka Obi-Uchendu, announced that two of the eleven evicted housemates will have the opportunity to return to the house (the following week) by having the majority of public votes.
: On Day 50, the host, Ebuka Obi-Uchendu, announced that no housemate will be put up for the public vote.
: On Day 64, the Head of House was made to add another housemate for possible eviction. The Head of House added Miracle.
: On Day 71, Housemates were subjected to a challenge and then ranked according to their performance. Alex ranked 1st place, making her the Head of House and putting other housemates up for possible eviction. Thereafter, Alex randomly picked a chance card empowering her to save one housemate of her choice, as well as the housemate that ranked 4th place in the day's challenge. Nina was automatically saved because she ranked 4th in the challenge, and Alex chose to save Tobi 
: On Day 78, Housemates voted Nina as Head of House - flouting Big Brother's directive to choose a housemate with the least experience as Head of House. On Day 79, Big Brother appointed Cee-C who then had the least Head of House experience, as Head of House. On Day 80, Big Brother made housemate select the Head of House of their choice, then Alex emerged the new Head of House

Repechage
On Day 49, the Host, Ebuka Obi-Uchendu, announced that two of the eleven evicted housemates will have the opportunity to return to the house (on Week 9) by having the majority of public votes.

References

External links 
 Official site

Nigeria
2018 Nigerian television seasons